The House of Khalifa is the ruling family of the Kingdom of Bahrain. The Al Khalifas profess Sunni Islam and belong to the Anizah tribe, some members of this tribe joined the Utub alliance which migrated from Central Arabia to Kuwait, then ruled all of Qatar, more specifically Al Zubarah, which they built and ruled over before settling in Bahrain in the early 17th century. The current head of the family is Hamad bin Isa Al Khalifa, who became the Emir of Bahrain in 1999 and proclaimed himself King of Bahrain in 2002, in fact becoming a constitutional monarch.

As of 2010, roughly half of the serving cabinet ministers of Bahrain were members of the Al Khalifa royal family, while the country's Prime Minister, Salman bin Hamad Al Khalifa, is also from the Al Khalifa family and is the son of the current King.

History 
Bahrain fell under the control of Ahmed ibn Muhammad ibn Khalifa in 1783, following the defeat of Nasr Al-Madhkur who ruled the archipelago as a dependency of Persia (see Bani Utbah invasion of Bahrain). Ahmed ruled Bahrain as hakim until 1796, but was based in Zubarah (in modern-day Qatar) and spent summers in Bahrain. Ahmed was the first hakim of Bahrain and the progenitor of the ruling Al Khalifa family of Bahrain. All of the Al Khalifa rulers of Bahrain are his descendants.

Ahmed had four children. Following his death in 1796, two of Ahmed's sons Salman and Abdulla moved to Bahrain, and co-ruled it as feudal estates and imposed taxes on the indigenous Baharnah population. Salman settled in Bahrain Island and Abdulla in Muharraq Island, each ruling independently. The Al Khalifa soon became split into two branches, Al-Abdulla and Al-Salman that engaged in open conflict between 1842 and 1846. Al-Salman branch was victorious and enjoyed complete rule of Bahrain. Until 1869, Bahrain was under threat of occupation by various external powers including the Wahhabis, Omanis, Ottomans, Egyptians and Persians, yet the Al Khalifa managed to keep it under their control. The Al-Abdulla branch continued to be a cause of threat until 1895. Today, Abdulla ibn Ahmad Al Khalifa descendants live in Qatar, while Salman ibn Ahmad Al Khalifa's descendants live in Bahrain.

List of Al Khalifa rulers of Bahrain
Since 1783, the Al Khalifa have been rulers of Bahrain:

Family Tree

Ruling Family Council
Decisions pertaining to the Al Khalifa family, as well as disputes between family members are arbitrated by the Ruling Family Council. The council attends to internal family disputes particularly those related to appropriation of land, sale of real estate and other properties. Members of the ruling family are not allowed to refer these or other disputes to ordinary law courts.

Relations between the political leadership and the rest of the "rank and file" members of the Al Khalifa ruling family have been formally managed by the council since 1932. However, on the eve of the 1973 parliamentary elections, then the Amir Isa bin Salman Al Khalifa issued a decree restructuring the Ruling Family Council to become a formal organ of the state, and giving the administrative head of the council the rank of minister.

The Ruling Family Council is chaired by King Hamad, its deputy chairman is Mohammed bin Khalifa bin Hamad Al Khalifa, and the director general is Ibrahim bin Khalid bin Mohammed Al Khalifa.

The King appoints the members of the board of the Ruling Family Council as recognised representatives of various kingship lines and factional alliances within the Al Khalifa family.

Transcription
Al Khalifa is commonly mistranscribed al-Khalifa. The Al (آل) written with the long (madda) alif is unconnected to the following word and means house, in the sense of family or dynasty, and is not the definite article particle al- 'Al' can also mean 'of'.

Cabinet ministers
As of 2010, roughly half of the serving cabinet ministers of Bahrain were members of the Al Khalifa royal family.

 Prince Salman bin Hamad Al Khalifa, Prime Minister, The Crown Prince, and Deputy Supreme Commander
 Shaikh Muhammad ibn Mubarak ibn Hamad Al Khalifah, Deputy Prime Minister
 Shaikh Ali bin Khalifa Al Khalifa, Deputy Prime Minister
 Shaikh Khalid bin Abdullah Al Khalifa, Deputy Prime Minister
 Lt-General Shaikh Rashid bin Abdulla Al Khalifa, Minister of Interior
 Shaikh Khalid bin Ahmed bin Mohammed Al Khalifa, Minister of Foreign Affairs
 Shaikh Ahmed bin Mohammed Al Khalifa, Minister of Finance
 Shaikh Khalid bin Ali bin Abdulla Al Khalifa, Minister of Justice, Islamic Affairs and Endowment
 Shaikh Mohammed bin Khalifa Al Khalifa, Minister of Oil

Notable people
 

Shaikha Dheya bint Ebrahim Al Khalifa, royal family member and President of the Riyada Group of Companies

Controversies

The King of Bahrain, King Al Khalifa was responsible for attacks on protesters during the Arab Spring. He and the Bahraini government were condemned both locally and overseas. He later enlisted the help of nearby Saudi Arabia and the UAE.

See also 
 List of Arabian Houses

Notes

References

External links
Bahrain: The Ruling Family of Al Khalifah, A. de L. Rush, Archive Editions, 1991
Cabinet of Bahrain
Genealogy of the Al Khalifa
Rulers.org — Bahrain List of rulers for Bahrain

 
Rabi`ah
Bahraini monarchs
Arab dynasties